Takatokwane is a village in Kweneng District of Botswana. It is located in Kalahari Desert, 80 km north-west of Jwaneng. The population was 1,590 in 2001 census.

References

Kweneng District
Villages in Botswana